Raja Rammohan Roy Mahavidyalaya, established in 1964, is a government affiliated college located at Radhanagar in the Hooghly district of West Bengal. It is affiliated to University of Burdwan and teaches arts, science and commerce.

Departments
Humanities
History
Political science
Geography

Gujarati

Accreditation
Recently, Raja Rammohan Roy Mahavidyalaya has been re-accredited and awarded B+ grade by the National Assessment and Accreditation Council (NAAC). The college is also recognized by the University Grants Commission (UGC).

See also

References

External links
Raja Rammohan Roy Mahavidyalaya

Colleges affiliated to University of Burdwan
Educational institutions established in 1964
Universities and colleges in Hooghly district
1964 establishments in West Bengal